Samantha Stosur was the defending champion, but withdrew before her quarterfinal match due to a left wrist injury.

Caroline Garcia won the title, defeating Mirjana Lučić-Baroni in the final 6–4, 6–1.

Seeds

Draw

Finals

Top half

Bottom half

Qualifying

Seeds

Qualifiers

Lucky losers

Draw

First qualifier

Second qualifier

Third qualifier

Fourth qualifier

Fifth qualifier

Sixth qualifier

References
Main Draw
Qualifying Draw

Internationaux de Strasbourgandnbsp;- Singles
2016 Singles
Internationaux de Strasbourg